The Rocky River is a river located in the Mid North region of the Australian state of South Australia.

Course and features
The river rises near the Wirrabara Forest and, after initially flowing north, flows in a generally southern direction past the towns of Wirrabara, Stone Hut, Laura and Gladstone before reaching its confluence with the Broughton River. Tributaries include Ippinitchie, Pine, Appila, Pisant, Narridy and Yackamoorundie creeks. The river descends  over its  course.

See also

References

Rivers of South Australia
Mid North (South Australia)